The men's team competition of the racquetball events at the 2011 Pan American Games will be held from October 23 to 25 at the Racquetball Complex in Guadalajara, Mexico.

Draw

Results

Round of 16

Quarterfinals

Semifinals

Final

References

Racquetball at the 2011 Pan American Games
Racquetball at multi-sport events